BBC Sunday-Night Play is the anthology drama series which replaced Sunday Night Theatre in 1960. It was broadcast on what was then BBC Television (now BBC One).

The series often included versions of modern theatrical successes, but original work appeared in the slot too. David Mercer's A Suitable Case for Treatment (1962) was later adapted as the feature film Morgan – A Suitable Case for Treatment (1966), while Madhouse on Castle Street  (1963) starred the then little known Bob Dylan.

The series ended in 1963. Out of a run of 138 episodes, only 15 are believed to survive.

Notes

References

External links 
 
 The Sunday-Night Play, BFI Film and Television Database

1960 British television series debuts
1963 British television series endings
BBC Television shows
1960s British anthology television series
Lost BBC episodes
Black-and-white British television shows
English-language television shows